Happy Valley is a suburban city in the Portland, Oregon metropolitan area. Happy Valley is near the northwest edge of Clackamas County, Oregon, United States approximately 10 miles to the southeast of downtown Portland, Oregon. The population was 23,733 at the 2020 census.

History
Happy Valley was originally settled by Christian and Matilda Deardorff after receiving 640 acres from The Donation Land Claim Act of 1850 in Clackamas County between a cinder cone volcano later name Mt. Scott and a knoll later named Scouters' Mountain. The settled region become known as Deardorff Valley, Deardorff Settlement and most popularly Christilla Valley (name formed by combining "Chris" from Christian and "Tilla" from Matilda).

The city was officially incorporated in 1965 and remained a small community until the late 1990s, when it became one of the fastest-growing cities in Oregon.

Local government
The City of Happy Valley is governed by the Happy Valley City Council which comprises a mayor (currently Tom Ellis), city council president (currently David Emami), and three other city council members (currently Joshua Callahan, Brett Sherman, and David Golobay). Mayor and Council members are elected to four year terms that are staggered to ensure at least two members are experienced at all times. There is also a planning commission, as well as a Park Advisory/Urban Forestry Commission and Citizen Traffic and Public Safety Committee.

Geography
It is a member of the Portland, Oregon metropolitan area, bordering Portland, Clackamas, Damascus, Pleasant Valley, and Sunnyside.

Scouters Mountain is also a prominent feature.

Climate
Happy Valley is one of the rainiest cities in the Portland metro area with a recorded annual rainfall average of 48 inches.

Demographics

2010 census

As of the census of 2010, there were 13,903 people, 4,408 households, and 3,724 families living in the city. The ethnic makeup of the city was 76.2% White, 1.1% African American, 0.5% Native American, 17.4% Asian, 0.2% Pacific Islander, 0.9% from other ethnicities, and 3.8% from two or more ethnicities. Hispanic or Latino of any ethnicity were 4.0% of the population.

There were 4,408 households, of which 48.8% had children under the age of 18 living with them, 74.4% were married couples living together, 6.3% had a female householder with no husband present, 3.7% had a male householder with no wife present, and 15.5% were non-families. 11.0% of all households were made up of individuals, and 3% had someone living alone who was 65 years of age or older. The average household size was 3.15 and the average family size was 3.40.

The median age in the city was 37 years. 30.2% of residents were under the age of 18; 6.8% were between the ages of 18 and 24; 27% were from 25 to 44; 27.9% were from 45 to 64; and 8.2% were 65 years of age or older. The gender makeup of the city was 49.7% male and 50.3% female.

2000 census
As of the census of 2000, there were 4,519 people, 1,431 households, and 1,302 families living in the city. The population density was 1,674.2 people per square mile (646.2/km2). There were 1,500 housing units at an average density of 555.7 per square mile (214.5/km2). The ethnic makeup of the city was 87.39% White, 8.85% Asian, 0.77% African American, 0.29% Native American, 0.15% Pacific Islander, 0.44% from other ethnicities, and 2.10% from two or more ethnicities. Hispanic or Latino of any ethnicity were 1.88% of the population.

There were 1,431 households, out of which 49.0% had children under the age of 18 living with them, 83.4% were married couples living together, 4.9% had a female householder with no husband present, and 9.0% were non-families. 6.3% of all households were made up of individuals, and 2.2% had someone living alone who was 65 years of age or older. The average household size was 3.16 and the average family size was 3.28.

In the city, the population was spread out, with 31.4% under the age of 18, 5.0% from 18 to 24, 30.1% from 25 to 44, 26.7% from 45 to 64, and 6.8% who were 65 years of age or older. The median age was 37 years. For every 100 females, there were 99.2 males. For every 100 females age 18 and over, there were 98.2 males.

The median income for a household in the city was $93,131, and the median income for a family was $95,922. Males had a median income of $68,125 versus $43,667 for females. The per capita income for the city was $36,665. About 0.6% of families and 1.2% of the population were below the poverty line, including 1.2% of those under age 18 and none of those age 65 or over.

Cost of living
Today, Happy Valley is one of the most expensive cities in the Portland metro with a median house price of $518,100.

Education
Happy Valley is part of the North Clackamas School District. Adrienne C. Nelson High School, Clackamas High School, Happy Valley Middle School, Rock Creek Middle School, Mount Scott Elementary,  Scouters Mountain Elementary, and Spring Mountain Elementary serve the student population.

Notable people
 Hailey Kilgore, actress
Bill Sizemore, American politician
Lori Chavez-DeRemer, American politician
Nigel Williams-Goss, American professional basketball player

See also

References

External links
Official website
Entry for Happy Valley in the Oregon Blue Book
Profile of Happy Valley from the State of Oregon's Infrastructure Finance Authority

1965 establishments in Oregon
Cities in Clackamas County, Oregon
Cities in Oregon
Portland metropolitan area